Merrill Mountain (in French: Montagne Merrill) is a mountain on the border between the Canadian province of Quebec, in the region of Estrie, and the U.S. state of Maine, which is part of the Appalachian Mountains; its altitude is .

Geography 

The mountain, located in the municipality of Frontenac, on the zec Louise-Gosford east of lac aux Araignées, is crossed by the Canada–United States border.

Toponymy
The toponym "Montagne Merrill" was formalized on November 7, 1985, by the Commission de toponymie du Québec.

See also 

List of mountain ranges of Quebec

References 

Le Granit Regional County Municipality
Canada–United States border
Mountains of Quebec under 1000 metres
Mountains of Franklin County, Maine